Eqah (born 25 October 1989), is a Bruneian singer who started out as a contestant on Passport to Fame (P2F), a television show in Brunei which has a similar concept to the Idol series.

Passport to Fame
Eqah was one of the Top 18 finalists on the third season of Passport to Fame (P2F) (2010). By the fourth week of performances, she received a standing ovation from one of the judges and was given a perfect score of 27 for her performance of the song "Cik Cik Ke Boom". She was one of the most voted contestants in the beginning of the series but was eliminated in the eighth week.

P2F performances

Music career
In July 2010, Eqah released her debut single, "If It Isn't With You" to radio stations in Brunei. It was a Top 3 hit on Brunei's Pelangi FM chart.

In January 2011, Eqah released the music video for her debut single "If It Isn't With You". It features American actor Rick Malambri and is directed by Amit & Naroop.

Awards and nominations

Discography
Singles

References

1989 births
Living people
English-language singers
Bruneian women singers
21st-century women singers